3-O-alpha-D-mannopyranosyl-alpha-D-mannopyranose xylosylphosphotransferase (XPT1) is an enzyme with systematic name UDP-D-xylose:3-O-alpha-D-mannopyranosyl-alpha-D-mannopyranose xylosylphosphotransferase. This enzyme catalyses the following chemical reaction

 UDP-xylose + 3-O-alpha-D-mannopyranosyl-alpha-D-mannopyranose  UMP + 3-O-(6-O-alpha-D-xylosylphospho-alpha-D-mannopyranosyl)-alpha-D-mannopyranose

Mn2+ required for activity.

References

External links 
 

EC 2.7.8